The National Collegiate Hockey Association (NCHA) is a defunct national organization of men's college- and university-level  ice hockey programs in the United States. The NCHA used to be known as the Collegiate Ice Hockey Association (CIHA) and the National Association of Intercollegiate Hockey (NAIH). The association was primarily composed of American Collegiate Hockey Association (ACHA) Division III teams from the Northeast.

History
The NAIH was formed in 2011 as an alternative to the ACHA for hockey teams that wanted a lower cost for membership and a high level of competition. However, many teams in the NCHA were also members of the ACHA.

In the spring of 2013, the NAIH changed its name to the CIHA and after the 2013-14 season changed its name to the NCHA.

In July 2014, the NCHA was sanctioned by the United Hockey Union, a branch of Amateur Athletic Union.

Teams
For the 2015–16 season, the NCHA had four conferences: North Eastern (New York), South Eastern (Pennsylvania/West Virginia), South Western (California) and the Independent Conference. The champion of each conference receives an automatic bid to Nationals.

North Eastern Conference
East Division
Albany College of Pharmacy and Health Sciences
Hamilton College
Le Moyne College
Union College
West Division
D'Youville College
Medaille College
St. John Fisher College
SUNY Brockport
University at Buffalo

South Eastern Conference
California University of Pennsylvania
Community College of Allegheny County
Penn State Altoona
University of Pittsburgh at Greensburg
West Virginia University

South Western Conference
Cal Lutheran
Chapman
UC San Diego
UC Santa Barbara
Ventura College

Independent Conference
Denison University
Otterbein University
Washington & Jefferson College
Wittenberg University

Founders Cup Champions
The 2012–13 season was the first year the NAIH held a national tournament. The national championship trophy was dubbed the Founders Cup.

See also
British Columbia Intercollegiate Hockey League (BCIHL)

References

External links
 NCHA official website
 @NCHAicehockey
 United Hockey Union official website

College ice hockey in the United States
Ice hockey governing bodies in the United States
College club sports associations in the United States